Pleșoi is a commune in Dolj County, Oltenia, Romania with a population of 3,800 people. It is composed of four villages: Cârstovani, Frasin, Milovan and Pleșoi. These belonged to Predești Commune until 2004, when they were split off.

References

Communes in Dolj County
Localities in Oltenia